Funny Cuts is a television programme strand on E4 which started on 7 July 2006. It features up and coming comedy talent. In its first episode it features Internet sensation Devvo played by Christian Webb and it was written by him and David Firth.

References

2000s British comedy television series
2006 British television series debuts
British comedy television shows